North Devon Raiders are a rugby league team based in Barnstaple, Devon. They play in the South West Rugby League.

History
The North Devon Raiders were formed in 2009 and joined the South West division of the Rugby League Conference for the 2010 season.

Raiders lost to Exeter Centurions in the 2012 South West cup final after having beaten them 80-0 earlier in the season. They also lost out on the South West Rugby League title after defeat to Devon Sharks in the Grand Final.

External links
 http://www.northdevonraiders.co.uk/

Rugby League Conference teams
Rugby clubs established in 2009
2009 establishments in England
Rugby league teams in Devon
Barnstaple
English rugby league teams